Tiffany Wright Clarke is an American-Jamaican basketball player.

Clarke attended Vanderbilt University.

Clarke played for Calais. Clarke later played for AB Chartres.

Clarke later played in Poland for Sunreef Yachts Politechnika Gdańska.

Clarke later played for Angers and La Roche Vendée.

References

Jamaican basketball players
Living people
1991 births
Basketball players in Poland
Vanderbilt Commodores athletes
People from Queens, New York